Conospermum scaposum is a shrub endemic to Western Australia.

It blooms between October and February producing blue flowers.

It is found in low swampy areas and along road verges in the Wheatbelt region of Western Australia where it grows in sandy-clay soils.

References

External links

Eudicots of Western Australia
scaposum
Endemic flora of Western Australia
Plants described in 1870